Ianduba is a genus of South American corinnid sac spiders first described by A. B. Bonaldo in 1997.

Species
 it contains fifteen species found in Brazil and Argentina:
Ianduba abara Bonaldo & Brescovit, 2007 – Brazil
Ianduba acaraje Magalhaes, Fernandes, Ramírez & Bonaldo, 2016 – Brazil
Ianduba angeloi Magalhaes, Fernandes, Ramírez & Bonaldo, 2016 – Brazil
Ianduba apururuca Magalhaes, Fernandes, Ramírez & Bonaldo, 2016 – Brazil
Ianduba beaga Magalhaes, Fernandes, Ramírez & Bonaldo, 2016 – Brazil
Ianduba benjori Magalhaes, Fernandes, Ramírez & Bonaldo, 2016 – Brazil
Ianduba capixaba Magalhaes, Fernandes, Ramírez & Bonaldo, 2016 – Brazil
Ianduba caxixe Bonaldo, 1997 – Brazil
Ianduba dabadu Magalhaes, Fernandes, Ramírez & Bonaldo, 2016 – Brazil
Ianduba liberta Magalhaes, Fernandes, Ramírez & Bonaldo, 2016 – Brazil
Ianduba mugunza Bonaldo & Brescovit, 2007 – Brazil
Ianduba patua Bonaldo, 1997 – Brazil
Ianduba paubrasil Bonaldo, 1997 – Brazil
Ianduba varia (Keyserling, 1891) – Brazil, Argentina
Ianduba vatapa Bonaldo, 1997 (type) – Brazil

References

Araneomorphae genera
Corinnidae
Spiders of Argentina
Spiders of Brazil